Glaucetas, sometimes transliterated Glauketas (fl. 315 – 300 BC), was a Greek privateer chiefly active in the Aegean Sea during the 4th century BC. Although little is known about his life, he is recorded in ancient Greek inscriptions describing how the Athenian navy under Thymochares of Sphettos raided his base on Kythnos and captured him and his men, thus "making the sea safe for those that sailed thereon." (I.G., II, 331.)

References
Ormerod, H. A. Piracy in the Ancient World. London-Liverpool, 1924, p. 116.
Pritchett, William Kendrick. The Greek State at War. Los Angeles: University of California Press, 1974. 
Rogozinski, Jan. Pirates!: Brigands, Buccaneers, and Privateers in Fact, Fiction, and Legend. New York: Da Capo Press, 1996.

External links
The Pirates Hold - Pirate Roster: G

Year of birth missing
Year of death missing
4th-century BC Greek people
Ancient Greek pirates
Kythnos